Ramón Hernández (born 1976) is a Venezuelan Major League Baseball catcher.

Ramón Hernández may also refer to:
Ramón Hernández (Negro leagues) (1907–?), Cuban baseball player
Ramón Hernández (pitcher) (1940–2009), Puerto Rican baseball pitcher
Ramón Hernández (fencer) (born 1953), Cuban Olympic fencer
Ramón Hernández Torres (born 1960), Puerto Rican politician and mayor of Juana Díaz
Ramón Hernández (beach volleyball) (born 1972), beach volleyball player from Puerto Rico
Ramón Montalvo Hernández (born 1974), Mexican PRD politician
Ramon Hernandez, fictional character in Marvel's Lasher (comics)